Julie Jane Storm (born February 22, 1933) is an American politician in the state of Minnesota. She served in the Minnesota House of Representatives.

Early life, education, and business career 
Storm was born in Long Prairie Minnesota. She spent most of her childhood in Minnesota. She was in the Macalester nursing program with Abbot-Northwestern Hospital.  Studies included first year of Chemistry, English, biology and other prep courses; then did training at the hospitals. Was a RN for over 25 years before pursuing a career in interior decorating. Took classes in interior design and became Board Interior Designer by the Florida Board of Architecture and Interior Design.  Had her own business until moving back to Minnesota to care for her mother.

Bought a historical home in St. Peter, renovated it and had a successful Bed & Breakfast (Engesser House) until 1998.  Was asked to run for the House of Representatives  24B. Was elected for a 2 year term.  Proudest moment was authoring a bill for Revision of Mechanics Lien after  contractors cheated many families in St. Peter following the tornado. It passed with 132 yeah votes, 0 nays.

Served on a Board to help new entrepreneurs and small businesses.  Started doing websites for clients and discovered she really liked doing it.  Also served Minnesota Board of Tourism and 
Minnesota Board of Aging.
Moved to Bella Vista Arkansas in 2008 and continued doing websites. Also do custom business cards. brochures and programs.  Still doing and have over 20 websites to maintain, mostly non-profits. Has served 3 terms on Arkansas Silver-Hair Legislature.

References

Women state legislators in Minnesota
Republican Party members of the Minnesota House of Representatives
1933 births
Living people
21st-century American women